Renault GTA may refer to:

 A performance version of the Renault Alliance
 The British market name for the Renault Alpine GTA

GTA